The Lord Ruthven Award is an annual award presented by the Lord Ruthven Assembly, a group of academic scholars specialising in vampire literature and affiliated with the International Association for the Fantastic in the Arts (IAFA).

The award is presented for the best fiction on vampires and the best academic work on the study of the vampire figure in culture and literature. The award is presented each March at the International Conference on the Fantastic in the Arts (ICFA) in Orlando. The award is named after Lord Ruthven, one of the first vampires in English literature.

Lord Ruthven Award: Non-Fiction

1994: David J. Skal, The Monster Show: A Cultural History of Horror 
1995: J. Gordon Melton, The Vampire Book: The Encyclopedia of the Undead
1996: Nina Auerbach, Our Vampires, Ourselves
1997: David J. Skal, V is for Vampire: An A to Z Guide to everything Undead
1998: Carol Margaret Davison & Paul Simpson-Housley, Eds., Bram Stoker's Dracula: Sucking Through the Century
1999: Carol A. Senf, Dracula: Between Tradition and Modernism
2001: Elizabeth Miller, Dracula: Sense and Nonsense
2002: Michael Bell, Food for the Dead: on the Trail of New England's Vampires
2003: William Patrick Day, Vampire Legends in Contemporary American Culture: What Becomes a Legend Most
2004: James B. South, Ed., Buffy the Vampire Slayer and Philosophy: Fear and Trembling in Sunnydale.
2005: Richard Dalby & William Hughes: Bram Stoker: A Bibliography
2006: Jorg Waltje, Blood Obsession: Vampires, Serial Murder, and the Popular Imagination.
2007: Bruce A. McClelland, Slayers and their Vampires: A Cultural History of Killing the Dead
2008: David Keyworth, Troublesome Corpses: Vampires and Revenants from Antiquity to the Present
2009: Elizabeth Miller & Robert Eighteen-Bisang, Eds., Bram Stoker's Notes for Dracula
2010: Mary Y. Hallab, Vampire God: The Allure of the Undead in Western Culture
2011: John Edgar Browning & Caroline Joan Picart, Dracula in Visual Media: Film, Television, Comic Book and Electronic Game Appearances
2012: Susannah Clements, The Vampire Defanged: How the Embodiment of Evil Became a Romantic Hero
2013: Jeffrey Weinstock, The Vampire Film: Undead Cinema
2014: Maria Lindgren Leavenworth & Malin Isaksson, Fanged Fan Fiction: Variations on Twilight, True Blood and The Vampire Diaries
2015: Margot Adler, Vampires Are Us: Understanding Our Love Affair with the Immortal Dark Side
2016: J. Gordon Melton & Alysa Hornick, The Vampire in Folklore, History, Literature, Film, and Television: A Comprehensive Bibliography
2017: David J. Skal, Something in the Blood: The Untold Story of Bram Stoker, the Man Who Wrote Dracula
2018: Gary A. Smith, Vampire Films of the 1970s
2019: Amy J. Ransom, I Am Legend as American Myth
2020: Sorcha Ni Fhlainn, Postmodern Vampires: Film, Fiction, and Popular Culture.
2021: Cait Coker, The Global Vampire: Essays on the Undead in Popular Culture Around the World.

Lord Ruthven Award: Fiction

1989: Brian Stableford, The Empire of Fear
1990: Nancy A. Collins, Sunglasses After Dark
1993: Kim Newman, Anno Dracula
1996: Barbara Hambly, Traveling with the Dead
1997: Jonathan Nasaw, The World on Blood
1998: Chelsea Quinn Yarbro, Writ in Blood
1999: P. N. Elrod, The Vampire Files: A Chill in the Blood
2000: Terry Pratchett, Carpe Jugulum
2001: Elaine Bergstrom, Blood to Blood: The Dracula Story Continues
2002: Jean Lorrah, Blood Will Tell
2003: Charlaine Harris, Living Dead in Dallas
2004: Andrew Fox, Fat White Vampire Blues
2005: David Sosnowski, Vamped
2006: Elizabeth Kostova, The Historian
2007: Barbara Hambly, Renfield: Slave of Dracula
2008: Joel H. Emerson, The Undead
2009: James Reese, The Dracula Dossier
2010: Guillermo del Toro and Chuck Hogan, The Strain
2011: S. M. Stirling, A Taint in the Blood
2012: Glen Duncan, The Last Werewolf
2013: Tim Powers, Hide Me Among the Graves
2014: Joe Hill, NOS4A2
2015: Lauren Owen, The Quick
2016: David Gerrold, Jacob
2017: Anne Rice, Prince Lestat and the Realms of Atlantis
2018: Charlaine Harris: The Complete Sookie Stackhouse Stories
2019: Theodora Goss, European Travel for the Monstrous Gentlewoman
2020: Marge Simon & Bryan D. Dietrich, The Demeter Diaries
2021: Grady Hendrix, The Southern Book Club's Guide to Slaying Vampires
2022: Jessica Lévai, The Night Library of Sternendach: A Vampire Opera in Verse

Lord Ruthven Award: Media/Popular Culture

2003:  Diary of a Virgin
2004:  Dracula
2005:  Vampire Dreams
2008:  Anthony Bourdain, No Reservations: Romania
2009:  True Blood
2011:  Being Human
2015:  Only Lovers Left Alive
2016:  What We Do in the Shadows
2017:  Vamped / The Vampire Historian
2018:  Midnight, Texas Season 1
2020:  What We Do in The Shadows

Lord Ruthven Special Award 

1997: Raymond T. McNally
2018: Hans Corneel de Roos for his translation of, and research on Makt Myrkranna (Powers of Darkness)

References

External links
The International Association for the Fantastic in the Arts

Vampires in written fiction
Horror fiction awards